Belgium have participated 2 times at the UEFA Women's Championship: Their best achievement is reaching the 
UEFA Women's Championships quarter final in (2022).

UEFA Women's Championship record

References 

 
Euro
Countries at the UEFA Women's Championship